Ján Bahýľ (25 May 1856 – 13 March 1916) was a Slovak inventor and engineer. He specialised in military science, military construction, and engineering. Flying machines were a particular interest of his. In 1895, he was granted a patent on the helicopter.

Biography
Bahýľ was born in Zvolenská Slatina in the Kingdom of Hungary (in present-day Slovakia). In 1869 he graduated from the Mining Academy of Banská Štiavnica (Selmecbánya) with a diploma in technical drawing. After graduation, he joined the Hungarian Army; his superior officers noticed his technical ability and transferred him to the technical staff. The new assignment allowed Bahýľ to study at the Vienna Military Academy, where he graduated in 1879 and was commissioned as a  lieutenant. During his time in the army, Bahýľ developed a number of inventions, many of which involved hydraulics.

Inventions
Bahýľ financed his first invention himself. It was called the Steam Tank, and was purchased by the Russian army.  Bahýľ was granted seventeen patents in all, including patents for the tank pump, a hot air balloon combined with an air turbine, the first petrol engine car in Slovakia (in partnership with Anton Marschall), and a lift to the Bratislava Castle.
He flew one of the earliest helicopter models which he developed using an internal combustion engine as a power source.

References

External links
Jan Bahyl biography
Jan Bahýľ Biography 
Jan Bahýľ 

1845 births
1916 deaths
People from Zvolen District
Slovak scientists
Slovak inventors